Sir Roger Blakemore Sands,  (born 6 May 1942) is a British retired public servant who served as Clerk of the House of Commons from 2003 to 2006.

Sands attended University College School in Hampstead, followed by Oriel College, Oxford. He joined the House of Commons as a parliamentary clerk in 1965. In the 2006 Queen's Birthday Honours, Sands was appointed a Knight Commander of the Order of the Bath (KCB) in recognition of his service as Clerk of the House and Chief Executive of the House of Commons.

References

1942 births
Living people
Clerks of the House of Commons
Knights Commander of the Order of the Bath
Alumni of Oriel College, Oxford